Rishta Ho To Aisa is a 1992 Indian Hindi-language drama film, produced by M.M.C. Cooper on the Marco Enterprises banner and directed by Kalptaru. Starring Jeetendra, Rishi Kapoor, Juhi Chawla, Sujata Mehta  and music composed by Laxmikant–Pyarelal.

Plot
Rajesh (Jeetendra) is a well-respected person in a village, who has a happy family, his wife Sharda (Sujata Mehta) and lovely daughter Pinky. He used to have a younger brother Vijay (Rishi Kapoor) who left the house at a very young age due to the thrashing from his father and becomes a pick-pocketer. Rajesh also comes to Bombay on some work and meets with an accident which was pre-arranged by his business rival Kalicharan (Paresh Rawal). Rajesh loses his memory, and his manager Giridhari Lal (Kader Khan) takes advantage of the situation and plants a beautiful girl Man Mohini (Swapna) in his house and Rajesh starts loving her. Meanwhile, Sharda and Pinky come to Bombay and circumstances prevail them to work as a servant in Rajesh's house only.

Simultaneously Vijay falls in love with Seema (Juhi Chawla), a stage dancer. Once Rajesh brings a costly necklace to Man Mohini. Vijay robs the necklace and gives it to Seema. The blame goes on Sharda and she has been put behind the bars. When Rajesh and Man Mohini finds Seema dancing with the same necklace and when Seema has been arrested Vijay comes and confesses the guilty. At the same time, Sharda is found pregnant and the question arises, whose child is it?  So Sharda tries to commit suicide along with Pinky, Vijay protects them and takes them back to their village where he releases that it is own house by seeing the portrait of his father and understands that Rajesh is his elder brother. At the same time Rajesh, Man Mohini, and Seema Kidnapped by Kalicharan, Vijay comes to their protection and in the quarrel, Kalicharan hits on Rajesh's forehead and he regains his memory. Finally, everyone is reunited and the movie ends with the marriage of Vijay and Seema.

Cast
Jeetendra as Rajesh
Rishi Kapoor as Vijay
Juhi Chawla as Seema
Sujata Mehta as Sharda
Swapna as Man Mohini
Kader Khan as Girdharilal
Paresh Rawal as Kalicharan
Sharat Saxena
Ashok Saraf

Soundtrack

References

1990s Hindi-language films
Films scored by Laxmikant–Pyarelal
Films directed by Kalpataru